Electroless deposition (ED) or electroless plating is defined as the autocatalytic process through which metals and metal alloys are deposited onto conductive and nonconductive surfaces. These nonconductive surfaces include plastics, ceramics, and glass etc., which can then become decorative, anti-corrosive, and conductive depending on their final functions. Electroplating unlike electroless deposition only deposits on other conductive or semi-conductive when a external current is applied. Electroless deposition deposits metals onto 2D and 3D structures such as screws, nanofibers, and carbon nanotubes unlike other plating methods such as Physical Vapor Deposition ( PVD), Chemical Vapor Deposition  (CVD), and electroplating which are limited to 2D surfaces.  Commonly the surface of the substrate is characterized via pXRD, SEM-EDS, and XPS which relay set parameters based their final funtionality. These parameters are referred to a Key Performaance Indicators crucial for a researcher’ or company's purpose. Electroless deposition continues to rise in importance within the microelectronic industry, oil and gas, and aerospace industry.

History

Electroless deposition was serendipitously discovered by Charles Wurtz in 1846. Wurtz noticed the nickel-phosphorus bath when left sitting on the benchtop spontaneously decomposed and formed a black powder.  70 years later François Auguste Roux rediscovered the electroless deposition process and patented it in United States as the ‘Process of producing metallic deposits. Roux deposited nickel-posphorous (Ni-P) electroless deposition onto a substrate but his invention went uncommercialized. In 1946 the process was re-discovered by Abner Brenner and Grace E. Riddell while working at the  National Bureau of Standards. They presented their discovery at the 1946 Convention of the American Electroplaters' Society (AES); a year later, at the same conference they proposed the term "electroless" for the process and described optimized bath formulations, that resulted in a patent. However, Abner nor Riddell benefited financial from the filed patent. The first commercial deposition of Ni-P was Leonhardt Plating Company in Cincinnati followed by the Kannigen Co. Ltd in Japan which revolutionized the industry. The Leonhardt commercialization of electroless deposition was a catalyst for the design and patenting of several deposition baths including plating of metals such as Pt, Sn, Ag, and their alloys. 

An elementary electroless deposititon process is  Tollens' reaction which is often used in scientific demonstrations. Tollens' reaction deposits a uniform metallic silver layer via ED on glass forming a reflective surface thus its reference as  silvering mirrors.   This reaction is used to test for aldehydes in a basic solution of silver nitrate. This reaction is often used as crude method used in chemistry demonstrations for the oxidation of an aldehyde to carboxylic acid, and the reduction of the silver cation into elemental silver (refective surface).

Electroless Deposition Preparation and Bath Stability 

Electroless deposition is an important process in the electronic industry for metallization of substrates. Other metallization of substrates also include physical vapor deposition (PVD), chemical vapor deposition (CVD), and electroplating which produce thin metal films but require high temperature, vacuum, and a power source respectively. Electroless deposition is advantageous in comparison to PVD, CVD, and electroplating deposition methods because it can be performed at ambient conditions. The plating method for Ni-P, Ni-Au, Ni-B, and Cu baths are distinct; however, the processes involve the same approach. The electroless deposition process is defined by four steps show in Fig.1 

(1) Pretreatment or functionalization of the substrate cleans the surface of the substrate to remove any contaminants which affects nanoparticle size and poor plating occurs. Pretreatment determines the porosity of the elemental metal deposition, and the initiation site of elemental deposition

(2) Sensitization is an activator ion that can reduce the active metal in the deposition bath and serves as a catalytic site for the templation of the active metal.

(3) Activation accelerates the deposition by acting as a catalytic seed on the substrate surface for the final electroless deposition bath metal.

(4) Electroless deposition is the process by which metal cation is reduced to elemental metal with a powerful reducing agent.

The electroless deposition bath constitutes the following reagents which affect the side product synthesis, bath lifetime and plating rates. 

(1) A source of metal cation which is provided by a metal salt (ex. Cu2+ from CuSO4 and Ni2+ from NiCl2)

(2) Reducing agent which donates electrons to the metal cation (ex. CH2O -formaldehyde for Cu2+ and NaH2PO2-sodium hypophosphite for Ni2+)

(3) Suitable complexing agent provide buffering action by preventing drastic fall and rise of pH, prevent nickel salt precipitation, and reduce the concentration of free nickel ions in solution. (ex.tartrate, EDTA, acetate etc.)  

(4) Stabilizer control plating rate and prevent decomposition of the bath. The deposition of a plating bath is preceded by hydrogan gas evolution but stabilizers are added to prevent random deposition of the ED bath. They are meticulously chosen to prevent loss of hydrogenation and dehydrogenation catalyst activity. Stabilizers fine-tune the autocatalytic nature of the bath while controlling the heterogeneous deposition of nanoparticles. 

(5) Buffering agent and pH stability. Deposition baths produce hydronium atoms which causes decrease in pH. If a bath becomes too acidic the hydrogen starts reducing at a higher rate than the metal and reduces the wt% of elemental metal produced. The metal is hydrolyzed and falls out of solution. The relationship between pH and standard potential (E0) is related to the activity of the hydronium ion in the Nersnt equation in relation to the potential.

E  Potential

E0 Standard Potential ( 0V for H+)

R Gas constant

T Temperature (K)

F Faraday's Constant

a activity 

E = E0 + [(RT/F)lnaH+] 

E = (RT/F)lnaH+

E = -2.303(RT/F)logaH+

E = -2.303(RT/F)pH

Potential decreases as the solution becomes more basic and this relationship is described by the Pourdaix Diagram.

All the above parameters are responsible for controlling side product release. Side product formation negatively affect the bath by poisoning the catalytic site, and disrupt the morphology of the metal nanoparticle.

Process

Fundamental Principle 

The electroless deposition process is based on redox chemistry in which electrons are released from a reducing agent and a metal cation is reduced to elemental metal. Equations (1) and (2) shows the simplified ED process where a reducing agent releases electrons, and the metal cation is reduced respectively.

The electroless deposition and electroplating bath actively performs cathodic and anodic reactions at the surface of the substrate. The standard electrode potential of the metal and reducing agent are important as a driving force for electron exchange. The standard potential is defined as the power of reduction of compounds. Examples are shown in Table 1., in which Zn with a lower standard potential (-0.7618 V) act as a reducing agent to copper (0.3419 V). The calculated potentials for the reaction of the copper salt and zinc metal is ~1.1 V meaning the reaction is spontaneous.

Since electroless deposition also uses the principles of standard electrode potentials we are also able to calculate potential, E, of metal ions in a solution governed by the Nernst equation (3).

E is the potential of the reaction, E0 is the standard reduction potential of the redox reaction, and Q is the concentration of the poducts divided by the concentration of the reactants .

ED is a not as simplistic as described in a metal exchange process shown in Table 1. Electrons for ED are produced by powerful reducing agents in the deposition bath ex. formaldehyde, sodium borohydride, glucose, sodium hypophosphite, hydrogen peroxide, and ascorbic acid. These reducing agents have negative standard potentials that drive the deposition process

The standard potential of the reducing agent and metal salt is not the only determinant of the redox reaction for electroless deposition. Conventional deposition of the copper nanoparticles uses formaldehyde as a reducing agent. But the E0 of formaldehyde is pH dependent. At pH 0 of the deposition bath is E0 of formaldehyde is 0.056 V, but at pH=14 the E0=-1.070. The formaldehyde (pH 14) is a more suitable reducing agent than at pH=0 because of the lower negative standard potential which makes it a powerful reducing agent. The potential  dependence on pH is described by the Pourdaix Diagram.

Four classic deposition mechanisms 
The first mechanism for electroless deposition, atomic hydrogen mechanism, was proposed until Brenner and Riddell for a nickel deposition bath. This lead the way for other scientist to propose several other mechanisms. The four examples of classical electroless deposition mechanism for Ni-P codeposition including: (1) Atomic hydrogen mechanism, (2) Hydride transfer mechanism, (3) Electrochemical mechanism, and (4) Metal hydroxide mechanism.  The classic mechanisms focused on the formation of a Ni-P  nanoparticles onto a substrate. Electroless nickel plating uses nickel salts as the metal cation source and either hypophosphite (H2PO2-) (or a borohydride-like compound) as a reducer. A side reaction forms elemental phosphorus (or boron) which is incorporated in the coating. The classical deposition methods follows the following steps:

1) Diffusion of reactants (Ni2+ , H2PO2-) to the surface

2) Adsorption of reactants at the surface

3) Chemical reaction at the surface

4) Desorption of products (H2PO3-, H2, H+, H-) from the surface

5) Diffusion of the product from the surface or adhesion of the product onto the surface

Atomic hydrogen mechanism 
Brenner and Riddle proposed the atomic hydrogen mechanism for evolution of Ni and H2 from a Ni salt, reducing agent, complexing agent, and stabilizers. They used a nickel chloride salt (NiCl2), sodium hypophosphite (NaH2PO2) reducing agent, commonly used complexing agents (ex. citrate, EDTA, and tridentates etc.), and stabilizers such as cethyltrimethyl ammonium bromide ( CTAB).

The redox reactions [4]-[6] proposes that adsorbed hydrogen (Had) reduces Ni2+ at the catalytic surface and has a secondary reaction where H2 gas evolves. In 1946 it was discovered that a Ni-P alloy and hydrogen gas was formed instead due to a secondary reaction of hypophosphite with atomic hydrogen to form elemental phosphorus. The standard potential for equation [4], [5], and [6] are 0.50 V, -0.25 V, and 0 V respectively. The potential of the bath overall is 0.25 V. NB the potential for the equation [4] is +0.50 V because the reaction has been reversed to illustrate oxidation.

Calculation E= Ered - Eox = (-0.25 V)-(-0.50 V) = 0.25 V (spontaneous reaction)

However, the atomic hydrogen mechanism did not account for the co-deposition of Ni-P.

The hydride transfer mechanism 
The hydride transfer mechanism was proposed by Hersh in 1955 which accounted for the deposition of elemental phosphorus.Hersh proposed the hydride transfer mechanism which was expanded in 1964 by R.M. Lukes to explain the deposition of elemental P.  Hydride transfer in a basic environment was purported [7] to form the hydride (H-)  which reduced the Ni2+ to Ni0[ 8], and combines with water to form H2 gas [9]. Lukes reasoned that the hydride ion came from the hypophosphite and thus accounts for the Ni-P codeposition through a secondary reaction. The standard potential for equation [7], [8], and [9] are 1.65  V, -0.25 V, and 0 V respectively. NB the potential for the equation [7] and [8] is +0.50 V because the reaction has been reversed to illustrate oxidation.

Calculation E= Ered - Eox = (-0.25 V)-(-1.65 V) = 1.45 V (spontaneous reaction)

Electrochemical mechanism

The electrochemical mechanism was also proposed by Brenner and Riddell but was later modified by others including scientist Machu and El-Gendi. They proposed that an electrolytic reaction occurred at the surface of the substrate, and H2 [11] and P [13] are by products of the Ni2+ ion reduction [10][11]. The anodic reaction [10] has a reduction potential of 0.50 V. The cathodic reactions [10], [11], [12], and [13] have reduction potentials of 0.50, -0.25 V, 0 V, and 0.50 V respectively. The potential of the reaction is 1.25 V (spontaneous reaction). 

NB the potential for the equation [10] and [13] is +0.50 V because the reaction has been reversed to illustrate oxidation.

Calculation  10 reaction of  [10] and [11]

E = Ered - Eox = (-0.25 V)-(-0.50V) = 0.25 V (spontaneous reaction)

Calculation  20 reaction of  [11] and [13]

E = Ered - Eox = (-0.25 V+ 0.50 V)-(-0.50 V) = 0.75 V (spontaneous reaction)

The 10 and 20 reactions havepositive potentials and therefore are competing reactions within the same bath.

Metal hydroxide mechanism 
Proposed in 1968, solvated Ni ions at the catalytic surface ionized water and forms a hydroxide coordinated Ni ion. The hydrolyzed Ni2+ ion catalyzes the production of Ni, P, and H2. Water is ionized at the Ni surface [14], and Ni2+ ions coordinate with hydroxide ions [15]. The coordinated Ni2+ is reduced [16] and NiOH+ab is adsorbed  on the substrate surface. At the surface H2PO2- reduces NiOH+ab to elemental Ni0 [17]. The released elemental H recombine to form hydrogen gas and [18] and elemental Ni catalyses the production of the P [19]. The deposited Ni acts as a catatalyst due continued reduction by H2PO2- [17]. Cavallotti and Salvago also proposed that the NiOH+ab [20] and water combination oxidises to Ni2+ and elemental H. The NiOH+ab participates in a competing reaction [21a] (refers  to  reaction [17] )and [21b] to for elemental Ni and hydrolized Ni respectively. Finally H2PO2- is oxidized [22] and elemental H [21a/21b] recombine to form and H2 evolves for both reactions. The overall reactions is shown in equation [23].

NB the potential for the equation [16], [19], [21a], [21b], and [22]  is +0.50 V because the reaction has been reversed to illustrate oxidation.

Cavallotti and Salvago

Calculation  10 reaction of [17]

E = Ered - Eox = (-0.25 V)-(-0.50V) = 0.25 V (spontaneous reaction)

Calculation  20 reaction of  [19]

E = Ered - Eox = (0.50)-(0.25V) = 0.25 V (spontaneous reaction)

Overall reaction [23] including the reduction of Ni2+

E = Ered - Eox = (-0.25 V + 0.50 V) -(-0.50 V) = 0.75 V  (spontaneous reaction)

Industrial applications 
Electroless deposition changes the mechanical, magnetic, internal stress, conductivity, and brightening of the substrate.  The first industrial application of electroless deposition by the Leonhardt Plating Company electroless deposition has flourished into metallization of plastics., textiles, prevention of corrosion, and jewelry. The microelectronics industry including the manufacturing of  circuit boards, semi-conductive devices, batteries, and sensors.

Metallization of plastics by electroless deposition 
Typical metallization of plastics includes  nickel-phosphorus, nickel gold, nickel-boron, palladium, copper, and silver. Metallized plastics are used to reduce the weight of metal product and reduce the cost associated with the use of precious metals. Electroless nickel plating is used in  variety of industries including aviation, construction, textiles, and oil and gas industries.

Electromagnetic interference shielding 
Electromagnetic interference shielding (EMI shielding) refers to the process by which devices are protected from interference from the electromagnetic radiation. The interference negatively affects the function of the devices; EMI sources include radiowaves, cell phones, and TV receiver. The Federal Aviation Administration and the Federal Communications Commission prohibits the use of cellphone after anairplane is airborne to avoid interference with navigation. Elemental Ni, Cu, and Ni/Cu coating on planes absorb noise signals in the 14 Hz to 1 GHz range.

Oil and gas production 
Elemental nickel coating prevents corrosion of the steal tubulars used for drilling. At the core of this industry nickel coats pressure vessels, compressor blades, reactors, turbine blades, and valves.

See also 

 Electroless copper deposition
 Electroless nickel-boron deposititon
Nanoparticle
Nanomaterial
Nanotechnology

References

Metal plating